David Michael M. San Juan is a Filipino Marxist writer, researcher, activist, and professor.  He was chosen Mananaysay ng Taon (Essayist of the Year) in 2009 and Makata ng Taon (Poet of the Year) in 2010 by the Komisyon sa Wikang Filipino (KWF or Commission in the Filipino Language).

Career
San Juan is an associate professor at the Filipino/Philippine Studies Department of De La Salle University and is the 4th congressional nominee of ACT Teachers Partylist in the 2016 elections, which gained two seats in the Philippine Congress.

San Juan is among the founders of the language advocacy group Tanggol Wika that successfully led initiatives to stop the implementation of a government order that abolishes the Filipino language subject in Philippine colleges and universities. He is also the current public information officer of the Alliance of Concerned Teachers-Private Schools (ACT-Private Schools) and president of the Pambansang Samahan sa Linggwistika at Literaturang Filipino (PSLLF/National Organization for Filipino Linguistics and Literature).

Awards
As a writer, San Juan won various competitions and was chosen Mananaysay ng Taon (Essayist of the Year) in 2009 and Makata ng Taon (Poet of the Year) in 2010 by the Komisyon sa Wikang Filipino (KWF or Commission on the Filipino Language). He was also a finalist in a 2009 climate change-themed essay writing contest organized by the World Bank

Research
As a researcher, he is a staunch critic of the Philippine government's Labor Export Policy and K to 12 scheme. He wrote a popular essay on "Noynoying" (Filipino-coined term which means "government inaction" on social ills) which was translated in French. In 2012, he presented a paper on "wang-wang" (literally: "siren" or "alarm", figuratively "call to action" for citizens and government) which was declared the Philippines' "Salita ng Taon" (Word of the Year) in a conference organized by the Filipinas Institute of Translation. In 2014, he co-presented a paper on "endo" (end of contract; Filipino colloquial term for labor contractualization/flexibilization) with John Kelvin R. Briones, which was declared as the Philippines' 2nd Word of the Year then.

References

Living people
Filipino Marxists
Filipino writers
Marxist writers
Filipino language activists
Filipino educators
Academic staff of De La Salle University
Year of birth missing (living people)